Javier "Javi" Jiménez García (born 11 March 1997) is a Spanish professional footballer who plays as a central defender.

Club career
Born in Aldaia, Valencia, Jiménez was a Valencia CF youth graduate. He made his debut as a senior with the reserves on 15 February 2015, starting in a 1–3 away loss against Gimnàstic de Tarragona in the Segunda División B.

On 15 August 2015 Jiménez signed a new contract with the Che, agreeing to a five-year deal. He made his first-team debut on 3 January 2017, starting in a 1–4 Copa del Rey home loss against Celta de Vigo; he also committed a penalty and scored an own goal during the match.

On 13 August 2020, Jiménez moved to Segunda División side Albacete Balompié on loan for the season. In June 2021, after the club's relegation, he signed a permanent contract with them, and helped in their return to the second level at first attempt with 22 appearances.

On 31 January 2023, after failing to play a single minute in the first half of the 2022–23 season, he terminated his contract with Alba.

Personal life
Jiménez's younger brother Pablo is also a footballer. A forward, he too was groomed at Valencia.

References

External links

Stats and Bio at Ciberche 

1997 births
Living people
People from Horta Oest
Sportspeople from the Province of Valencia
Spanish footballers
Footballers from the Valencian Community
Association football defenders
Segunda División players
Primera Federación players
Segunda División B players
Valencia CF Mestalla footballers
Valencia CF players
Albacete Balompié players
Spain youth international footballers